The  were committed by four members of the , a yakuza gang based in Omuta, Fukuoka, Japan. The Kitamura-gumi was affiliated with the Dojin-kai crime syndicate. The four were sentenced to death for the murder of four people between 18 and 20 September 2004.

Summary
Mami Kitamura had borrowed money from a 58-year-old woman, Sayoko Takami. On 18 September 2004, Mami, her husband and two sons strangled Sayoko and shot her 18-year-old son Tatsuyuki and his 17-year-old friend Junichi Hara. They put the victims in a car, which they dumped into a river. On 20 September, they strangled Sayoko's 15-year-old son Joji, whose half-naked body was found on 21 September. When the police arrested Mami the following day, she confessed to the killing of the other three victims. The police found the car containing the bodies of the three victims in the Suwa River in Omuta.

The other participants in the murders included Mami's husband Jitsuo Kitamura, the leader of Kitamura-gumi; Takashi Kitamura, her son from a previous marriage; and Takahiro Kitamura, her second son. As police were closing in, Jitsuo made an unsuccessful attempt to kill himself with a handgun. Takashi escaped from the police, but was recaptured. Jitsuo insisted that he had committed the murders alone, but the police regarded Mami as the main offender.

They were disruptive during their trials. On 17 October 2006, Mami and Takahiro were sentenced to death. Jitsuo and Takashi were sentenced to death on 28 February 2007. On December 25, the Fukuoka high court upheld the original sentence for Mami and Takahiro, and then Takahiro screamed in the court, "Merry Christmas!" On 27 March 2008, the Fukuoka high court also upheld the original sentence for Jitsuo and Takashi.

References

Popular culture
 – 2010 book about the murder by Tomohiko Suzuki
Death Row Family -2017 film based on the book

External links
Mob wife arrested for dumping body The Japan Times September 23, 2004
Mom, boys pulled from watery grave following yakuza wife's The Japan Times September 25, 2004
Arrest made over bodies found in river The Japan Times September 26, 2004
Murder suspect escapes unlocked interrogation room The Japan Times November 14, 2004
Mobster's wife, son to hang for four murders in 2004 The Japan Times October 18, 2006
Mom, son's death sentences upheld The Japan Times December 26, 2007

Mass murder in 2004
Ōmuta, Fukuoka
People murdered by the Yakuza
2004 murders in Japan
Organized crime events in Japan
September 2004 events in Japan